Plava Trava Zaborava (English: Blue Grass Oblivion) is a country and western band formed in Zagreb, Croatia in 1982. The band members are from Croatia and one member is from Serbia. So far, they have sold more than 500,000 album copies.

The band was the first to explore in country and western music in Yugoslavia at the time. They first held concerts in Europe, mainly in country and western festivals. The world encyclopedia of country and western music issued by Virgin in 1998, the same year the Dutch Country and Western Federation was added to the third best performers live in the world.

In addition to original songs, the band performed covers of domestic hits and original works. The songs were written by Eduard Jimmy Matešic, and they have successfully cooperated with many local and international artists, authors and musicians.

Discography
Live! (1984)
Country (1985)
Hat trick (1987)
Dance all night - live (1988)
Plava trava zaborava (1990)
Muddy river blues (1996)
I to sam ja (1997)
16 nam je godina tek (1998)
Ultimate collection (2009)

References

External links
Muzika.hr

Croatian country music groups
Musical groups established in 1982
1982 establishments in Yugoslavia